Golab may refer to rose water. It may also refer to:

Places
 Golab, Iran (disambiguation), places in Iran
 Gołąb (disambiguation), places in Poland

People
 Tony Golab (1919–2016), Canadian football player
 Gołąb (surname), Polish surname

See also